Sarah Lucia Hoagland (born 4 June 1945 in Denver, Colorado) is the Bernard Brommel Distinguished Research Professor and Professor Emerita of Philosophy and Women's Studies at Northeastern Illinois University in Chicago.

Biography
She authored Lesbian Ethics: Toward New Value. She was also co-editor (with Julia Penelope) of For Lesbians Only, an anthology of writing on the topic of lesbian separatism, and (with Marilyn Frye) Re-reading the Canon: Feminist Interpretations of Mary Daly.

Hoagland is a collective member of the Institute of Lesbian Studies in Chicago, a staff member of the Escuela Popular Norteña, and a Research Associate of the Philosophy Interpretation and Culture Center at Binghamton University (Vestal, New York).

In 2000, Hoagland was inducted into the Chicago Gay and Lesbian Hall of Fame.

In 2017, Hoagland married her partner of 34 years, Anne Leighton.

Works

Books

Essays

Reviews

References

External links
 Sarah Hoagland.com

1945 births
Living people
20th-century American philosophers
20th-century American women writers
21st-century American philosophers
21st-century American women writers
American feminist writers
American philosophy academics
American women philosophers
Anti-pornography feminists
Feminist philosophers
Feminist studies scholars
Gender studies academics
Lambda Literary Award winners
Lesbian academics
Lesbian feminists
Lesbian separatists
LGBT people from Colorado
LGBT philosophers
American lesbian writers
Northeastern Illinois University faculty
Radical feminists
American women non-fiction writers
21st-century American non-fiction writers
People from Denver